Jasoos ( spy) is an unmanned aerial vehicle designed and manufactured by SATUMA of Pakistan. The Jasoos II Bravo+ variant is currently operational with the Pakistan Air Force.

The Jasoos is controlled remotely from the ground control station (GCS) via a line-of-sight data-link. It can carry a range of payloads weighing up to 20 kg, the standard version being equipped with a daytime and low light camera capable of panning and tilting 360 degrees in azimuth and +/- 105 degrees in elevation. Endurance is stated to be greater than 5 hours.
Jasoos II is believed to be based on the AWC Bravo+.

Jasoos II is a state of the art UAV to be employed for real time information and situational awareness. Bravo+, variant of Jasoos II UAV has been inducted in the Pakistan Air Force. Since its induction in Pakistan Air Force in 2004, Bravo+ has proven to be very reliable system that is extremely easy to operate and maintain. The UAV takeoff and land conventionally from a runway under manual control. Once airborne the UAV can fly autonomously where as mission can be controlled using line-of-site data links. Jasoos II can carry a variety of controllable payloads of up to 20 kg with an endurance of greater than 4 to 5 hours. The standard variant of Jasoos II is equipped with a steer-able day/low light camera pod capable of being steered 360 deg in azimuth and +/- 105 deg in elevation giving it the capability of panoramic viewing. Bravo+ is currently in production for the Pakistan Air Force as their primary work horse for UAV Operations and Training Program.

Specifications (Jasoos II Bravo+)

See also
 Pakistan Air Force

References

Jasoos
Science and technology in Pakistan
Unmanned military aircraft of Pakistan
2000s Pakistani military reconnaissance aircraft